Sheppard can refer to:

Places
 Sheppard, Wisconsin, an unincorporated community, United States
 Sheppard Avenue in Toronto, Canada named for Joseph Shepard (1765-1837). Hence:
  Sheppard subway line
 Sheppard West (TTC), formerly Downsview, subway station
 Sheppard-Yonge (TTC), formerly Sheppard, subway station
 Kate Sheppard House, the historic home of civil rights campaigner Kate Sheppard
 Sheppard Air Force Base in Texas, United States

Other
 Sheppard (name)
 Sheppard (band), an Australian Brisbane-based rock band
Sheppard (EP)

See also
 Shepherd (disambiguation)
 Shepard (disambiguation)

ru:Шепард